José Francisco Chaves (June 27, 1833 – November 26, 1904) was a nineteenth-century military leader, politician, lawyer and rancher from the New Mexico Territory.

Biography

Family 
José Francisco Chaves was born on June 27, 1833, in Los Padillas, New Mexico (then in the Departmento de Nuevo México of the United Mexican States) in what is now Bernalillo County, near Albuquerque, New Mexico.  His father was Don Mariano Chaves and his mother Dolores Perea was the daughter of Don Pedro Jose Perea of Bernalillo.  She later married Dr. Henry Connelly, who became Territorial New Mexico governor during the Civil War. José's father, Don Mariano Chaves, was chief of staff under Governor Manuel Armijo in the revolution of 1837 and inspector general of all the military forces of New Mexico. Don Mariano later served as pro-tem governor under Mexican rule in the absence of governor Armijo. José Francisco was a paternal grandson of Don Francisco Xavier Chávez, the first Governor (1822–1823) of the Departmento de Nuevo México under the independent First Mexican Empire shortly after Mexican War of Independence from Spain ended in 1821. José was also a first cousin of Francisco Perea and of Pedro Perea.
Related to the Chaves Family of Fall River in Massachusetts.

Early life 
José Francisco Chaves attended schools in St. Louis, Missouri, studied medicine at the New York College of Physicians and Surgeons and engaged in livestock raising in the New Mexico Territory. He married Mary Bowie in 1857, who died in 1874, leaving two children, Lola and Francesca. The former married Mariano Armijo, descendant of a prominent family of Bernalillo county, NM. The latter died in 1895.

Chaves served as a soldier in campaigns against the Navajos prior to the Civil War. At the outbreak of the Civil War, Governor Connelly commissioned Chaves as major when the 1st Regiment NM Volunteers for the Union Army formed. After Ceran St. Vrain resigned his commission with the 1st, Kit Carson was appointed colonel and Chaves was promoted to lt-colonel. In 1862 he took part in the Battle of Valverde. He was recognized for gallant and meritorious services, and later helped establish Fort Wingate, of which he was post commander for a long period. He was honorably mustered out of the service of the United States in 1865.

Chaves owned an Indigenous girl named Maria in 1860 to "mark his social wealth". It is likely that he abducted the thirteen-year-old girl either during a raid on an Indigenous community or by purchasing her at a rescate (auction). Chavez's mother and step-father owned as many as four enslaved Indigenous children.

Political career 
Returning home he began to study law and in due course was admitted to the bar. In politics he was a staunch Republican and in 1858, while absent campaigning against the Navajos, was elected a member of the House of Representatives of the territorial legislative assembly, taking his seat in 1860. In 1865 he was elected delegate from the New Mexico Territory to the U.S. House of Representatives and served in the 39th and 40th Congresses from 1865 to 1867. He was elected back to the House of Representatives in 1868 and successfully contested the election of Charles P. Clever in 1869, serving again until 1871, being unsuccessful for reelection in 1870. In 1875, he was elected a member of the legislative council from Valencia County and was reelected to every succeeding legislature. Chaves was president of the New Mexico Territorial Council for eight sessions.

Chaves continued in farming and livestock raising. He was district attorney of the second judicial district from 1875 to 1877 and was a member and president of the New Mexico constitutional convention in 1889. He was New Mexico Superintendent of Public Instruction from 1903 to 1904 and was appointed New Mexico State Historian in 1903, but his career was cut short by an assassination in Pinoswells, New Mexico on November 26, 1904, where he was shot through a window while dining in the home of a friend.  The identity of his assassin remains a mystery. He was interred in Santa Fe National Cemetery in Santa Fe, New Mexico.

His daughter, Dolores Elizabeth "Lola" Chávez de Armijo, is noted for her successful fight to keep her job as state librarian after Governor William C. McDonald attempted to remove her on the basis that she was a woman.

See also

Hispanics in the American Civil War
List of Hispanic Americans in the United States Congress
List of assassinated American politicians

References

Additional references
 Retrieved on 2008-02-14
Charles A. Curtis. Army Life in the West (1862-1865). CreateSpace Independent Publishing Platform, April 20, 2017. .

|-

1833 births
1904 deaths
1904 murders in the United States
19th-century American politicians
American military personnel of the Indian Wars
American politicians of Mexican descent
Assassinated American politicians
Burials at Santa Fe National Cemetery
Deaths by firearm in New Mexico
Delegates to the United States House of Representatives from New Mexico Territory
District attorneys in New Mexico
Farmers from New Mexico
Hispanic and Latino American members of the United States Congress
Hispanic and Latino American people in New Mexico politics
Members of the New Mexico Territorial Legislature
Neomexicano slave owners
New Mexico Republicans
People from Bernalillo County, New Mexico
People murdered in New Mexico
People of New Mexico in the American Civil War
Union Army officers
Assassinated American territory politician